Podhradie is a village and municipality in Martin District in the Žilina Region of northern Slovakia.

History
In historical records the village was first mentioned in 1699.

Geography
The municipality lies at an altitude of 480 metres and covers an area of 16.396 km2. It has a population of about 690 people.

External links
http://www.statistics.sk/mosmis/eng/run.html

Villages and municipalities in Martin District